Akoumia is a traditional Cretan village of about 450 people in the southern part of the Rethymno regional unit, famous for the two Triopetra (meaning three stones) beaches. It is part of the municipality Agios Vasileios.

External links 

Triopetra View 

Populated places in Rethymno (regional unit)